Kamachal-e Pain Mahalleh (also Romanized as Kamāchāl-e Pā’īn Maḩalleh; also known as Kamāchāl) is a village in Kisom Rural District, in the Central District of Astaneh-ye Ashrafiyeh County, Gilan Province, Iran. At the 2006 census, its population was 306, in 97 families.

References 

Populated places in Astaneh-ye Ashrafiyeh County